Project Liberty may stand for:
Liberty Alliance Project, a broad-based industry standards consortium developing suites of specifications defining federated identity management and web services communication protocols
Project Liberty Ship, a non-profit organization found in 1978 to save a Liberty Ship, the SS John W. Brown as a memorial for men and women of Liberty Ships during World War II
The Liberty Project, a team of former supervillains into superheroes of Eclipse Comics
 Project Liberty, a USAF plan to rapidly create and field the MC-12W aircraft for Intelligence, Surveillance & Reconnaissance
 Project LIBERTY, a cellulosic ethanol endeavor  by Jeff Broin.